The Smile is a 1994 French drama film directed by Claude Miller. Moving between reality and dream, it tells the story of a psychiatrist (Jean-Pierre Marielle) facing imminent death who follows the fantasy of one last love affair with a much younger woman (Emmanuelle Seigner). She also follows a fantasy of being a stripper who drives men wild, and is herself close to death.

The theme of the film is stated at the outset by a mock-Chinese quote: Let us hurry to enjoy creatures in their youth. Let's gorge ourselves on best wines and scents. Never let the blooming flower fade.

Plot
In a private clinic set in a country estate, the aging psychiatrist Pierre-François collapses with a heart attack from listening to the steamy fantasies of a sex-mad young patient Brigitte. After examining him, his colleague Gaby warns him that the next attack could come at any time and will probably be the last one. Feeling the need to settle things, he goes to see his ex-wife Chantal at Saint-Trojan-les-Bains, returning a picture that she had treasured but that he had kept.

On the train he is struck by the sight of a young woman asleep, who projects an aura of sensuality. She is Odile, a tennis coach, whom he later sees at the beach. Odile suffers from mysterious nosebleeds. Back at his clinic Pierre-François goes cycling and loses control of his bicycle while going downhill through a wood that takes him to Odile's tennis club. As there is a travelling fair in the nearby town, he asks her to meet him there. She has already investigated the fair on her own, being fascinated by the strip show and catching the eye of its manager Jean-Jean, who asks if she would like to try this line of work. The date ends with Pierre-François on the ground with a bloody nose after he tries to kiss Odile, but in the morning each forgives the other.

Jean-Jean tells Odile it would be better if she worked for a show further from home, saying he will take her to see his friend La Tante at Angoulême. Odile asks  Pierre-François to come along as her companion. After visiting La Tante, the three go off for a meal, which ends badly with Odile storming out and Pierre-François, after collapsing, being put in an upstairs room. Later, Odile joins him there and the two make love.

The next day, after Odile has spent some time getting to know the strippers, La Tante puts her on stage clothed among four naked girls. She strips to huge applause and then in a trance glides into the wildly excited audience. Pierre-François desperately tries to get to her through the packed crowd but he is too late, for she has collapsed dead.

Cast
 Jean-Pierre Marielle as Pierre-François 
 Richard Bohringer as Jean-Jean
 Emmanuelle Seigner  as Odile
 Bernard Verley as The aunt
 Nathalie Cardone as Brigitte
 Nadia Barentin as Gaby
 Christine Pascal as Chantal

Production
After a few appearances in TV series, Mathilde Seigner made her film debut in this movie in which her sister, Emmanuelle, was the main character. In this film, Mathilde Seigner plays a stripper and performs a dance number completely naked. Surrounded by three other dancers, the young woman performs a very sexy number in a cabaret in front of an audience. A modest role in terms of screen presence, but a bold and difficult one to tackle for the young actress, who drank 8 cognacs before the scene to give herself courage.

References

External links

1994 films
French drama films
1994 drama films
1990s French-language films
Films directed by Claude Miller
Films about psychiatry
Films about striptease
1990s French films